Aziz Ahmed Khan (born 1978) is an Indian politician. In 2016, he was elected as  MLA of Karimganj South Vidhan Sabha constituency in Assam Legislative Assembly. He is an All India United Democratic Front  politician. Just before the 2021 Assembly election, he resigned from the AIUDF and joined the Asom Gana Parishad, but lost to Siddeque Ahmed in the election.

Biography
Aziz Ahmed Khan was born in 1978, to a Bengali Muslim family from Farampasha in Karimganj. His father is Mozir Uddin Ahmed Khan.

References

All India United Democratic Front politicians
Living people
Asom Gana Parishad politicians
People from Karimganj district
21st-century Bengalis
1978 births